Felipa Alicia Palacios Hinestroza (born December 1, 1975 in Bojaya, Chocó) is a retired female track and field athlete from Colombia, who competed in the sprint events.

Career
She represented her native country in three consecutive Summer Olympics, starting in 1996. Palacios won the bronze medal in the women's 200 metres at the 1999 Pan American Games in Winnipeg, Manitoba, Canada.

Achievements

References

External links

1975 births
Living people
Colombian female sprinters
Athletes (track and field) at the 1995 Pan American Games
Athletes (track and field) at the 1999 Pan American Games
Athletes (track and field) at the 1996 Summer Olympics
Athletes (track and field) at the 2000 Summer Olympics
Athletes (track and field) at the 2004 Summer Olympics
Olympic athletes of Colombia
Sportspeople from Chocó Department
Pan American Games bronze medalists for Colombia
Pan American Games medalists in athletics (track and field)
South American Games gold medalists for Colombia
South American Games silver medalists for Colombia
South American Games medalists in athletics
Competitors at the 1994 South American Games
Competitors at the 1998 South American Games
Medalists at the 1995 Pan American Games
Medalists at the 1999 Pan American Games
Central American and Caribbean Games medalists in athletics
Olympic female sprinters
20th-century Colombian women